Siloam Cemetery is the oldest cemetery in the city of Vineland in Cumberland County, New Jersey.  It was listed on the National Register of Historic Places on April 3, 2020, for its significance in architecture and landscape architecture.

The cemetery, located at 550 North Valley Avenue, was established in 1864 on a plot of land donated by Charles K. Landis, the founder of Vineland.  A chapel was constructed in 1918 and features Gothic Revival architecture. It is located in the center of one of the original sections of the cemetery. Many local residents, some of whom were nationally prominent, are buried there.

Notable interments

 Henry Herbert Goddard (1866–1957), researcher at Vineland Training School
 Charles K. Landis (1833–1900), founder of Vineland, an attorney, author, and real estate developer
 Jeanette DuBois Meech (1835–1911), evangelist and industrial educator
 Mary Elizabeth Tillotson (1816–1888), a dress reformer, spiritualist, suffragist, and poet. Tillotson organized the country’s first anti-fashion convention in 1874, and symbolically voted in the first presidential election held after the Civil War.
 Mary Treat (1831?–1923), a naturalist who corresponded with Charles Darwin
 Thomas Bramwell Welch (1825–1903), developer of Welch's grape juice

See also
National Register of Historic Places listings in Cumberland County, New Jersey

References

External links
 
 
 Friends of Historic Vineland

Cemeteries in Cumberland County, New Jersey
Vineland, New Jersey
1864 establishments in New Jersey
Cemeteries on the National Register of Historic Places in New Jersey
National Register of Historic Places in Cumberland County, New Jersey
New Jersey Register of Historic Places
Historic districts on the National Register of Historic Places in New Jersey